The following page lists all power stations in Central African Republic.

Hydroelectric

Thermal

See also 

 List of power stations in Africa
 List of largest power stations in the world
 Energy in the Central African Republic

References 

Central African Republic
Power stations